is a railway station operated by the Kominato Railway Company's Kominato Line, located in Ichihara, Chiba Prefecture, Japan. It is 10.6 kilometers from the western terminus of the Kominato Line at Goi Station.

History
Kōfūdai Station was opened on December 23, 1976, to serve a new suburban housing development.

Lines
Kominato Railway Company
Kominato Line

Station layout
Kōfūdai Station has a single island side platform connected to the station building by an overpass.

Platforms

Adjacent stations

External links

   Kominato Railway Company home page

Railway stations in Japan opened in 1976
Railway stations in Chiba Prefecture